Campiglione Fenile is a comune (municipality) in the Metropolitan City of Turin in the Italian region Piedmont, located about  southwest of Turin.

Campiglione-Fenile borders the following municipalities: Bricherasio, Cavour, and Bibiana. The comune was formed in 1928 by merging the two previous comuni of Campiglione and Fenile.

References

Cities and towns in Piedmont